Gary Clail (born 1956) is an English singer and record producer, and the founder of the Gary Clail Sound System. He was part of On-U Sound Records (and also the On-U Sound System) and led Gary Clail's Tackhead Sound System. They had a big hit in clubs with the 1991 song "Human Nature".

Biography
Clail worked originally as a roofer, but during the mid- to late 1980s, based in Bristol, he became a warm-up act for On-U gigs. Clail first released a record in 1985.  Several 12" singles  were issued between 1985 and 1987, before Clail's first LP for Nettwerk, Tackhead Tape Time, a split effort between  Clail and Tackhead. "Television: The Drug of the Nation" by The Beatnigs was remixed by Clail, Adrian Sherwood and Mark Stewart, on the Alternative Tentacles record label in 1988.

In 1989, Clail, billed as Gary Clail & On-U Sound System, released an album on the label On-U Sound, marking his entrance to the electronic underground scene in Bristol, eventually leading him to work with RCA a couple of years later. This output incorporated several singles and EPs, as well as the Emotional Hooligan album (1991).

Clail released a further album on Yelen Records, entitled Keep the Faith (1996).

In 2013 Clail formed the Gary Clail Sound System and began work on the album 'Nail It To The Mast'. It was released on 15 December 2014.

Discography

Singles
Gary Clail - "Half Cut for Confidence" (1985)
Gary Clail and Tackhead - "Hard Left" (1986)
Tackhead / Gary Clail - "Reality" (1989)
Gary Clail On-U Sound System featuring Bim Sherman - "Beef" (1990) – UK #64
Gary Clail On-U Sound System - "Human Nature" (1991) – UK #10, AUS #38, IRE #27, NED #69
Gary Clail On-U Sound System - "Escape" (1991) – UK #44, AUS #117
Gary Clail On-U Sound System - "The Emotional Hooligan" (1991)
Gary Clail On-U Sound System - "Who Pays The Piper?" (1992) – UK #31, AUS #177
Gary Clail On-U Sound System - "These Things Are Worth Fighting For" (1993) – UK #45, AUS #157
Gary Clail On-U Sound System - "Speak No Evil" (1993) (promotional release only)
Gary Clail - "Another Hard Man" (1995) – UK #86

Studio albums
Gary Clail On-U Sound System - End Of The Century Party (1989)
Gary Clail On-U Sound System - Emotional Hooligan (1991) – UK #35, AUS #95
Gary Clail On-U Sound System - Dreamstealers (1993) – AUS #180, NZ #38
Gary Clail - Keep The Faith (1995)
Gary Clail Soundsystem - Nail it to the Mast (2014)

Compilation albums
Gary Clail - Human Nature: The Very Best of Gary Clail (1997)

References

External links
2014 Release Nail It To The Mast
Official Tackhead website
Artist page at unofficial On-U Sound site
Discography page at unofficial On-U Sound site
On-U Sound website

Living people
English record producers
English rock singers
English male singers
Musicians from Bristol
On-U Sound Records artists
Tackhead members
1959 births